Veronika Arkadyevna Dolina (born on January 2, 1956, Moscow)  is a Soviet and Russian poet, bard, and songwriter. She is mother of Russian film critic Anton Dolin.

Veronika Dolina was born in Moscow. He farther was Arkady Fisher, an aircraft designer, her mother was a doctor, Candidate of Medical Sciences, Ludmila Dolllina. Her maternal grandfather was famous neurophysiologist Aleksander Dolin.  In 1979, she graduated from the Moscow State Pedagogical Institute as a French language teacher.

Dolina started to write songs and perform them in 1971. She wrote the poetry for most of her songs, but she also has songs that set the poems of Yunna Morits to music, as well as some songs that were written in cooperation with Alexander Sukhanov. Dolina's first record was released in 1986. In 1987, Dolina became a member of the Moscow drama committee. That same year, the first book with Dolina's poetry was published in Paris.

In 1988 she visited Warsaw, Poland for the first time, together with other Russian bards, giving a concert in Hybrydy concert hall, and was applauded for her interpretations.  She performed several songs, including "My house is flying", 'There was another Widow', and many more.

References

External links
 

1956 births
Living people
Musicians from Moscow
Russian bards
Russian women poets
Russian women singer-songwriters
Russian singer-songwriters
Soviet women singers
Soviet songwriters
Soviet women singer-songwriters
Soviet singer-songwriters
Moscow State Pedagogical University alumni
20th-century Russian women singers
20th-century Russian singers
Russian Jews